Rockville Township may refer to the following townships in the United States:

 Rockville Township, Kankakee County, Illinois
 Rockville Township, Stearns County, Minnesota
 Rockville Township, Bates County, Missouri